Dust is an upcoming American psychological horror-thriller film written and directed by Karrie Crouse and co-directed by Will Joines. It stars Sarah Paulson and Annaleigh Ashford.

Dust is scheduled to be released by Searchlight Pictures as a Hulu original film.

Premise
In 1930s Oklahoma, a young mother haunted by the past becomes convinced that a mysterious presence in dust storms is threatening her family and takes extraordinary measures to protect them.

Cast
 Sarah Paulson
 Annaleigh Ashford
 Ebon Moss-Bachrach
 Bill Heck
 Amiah Miller

Production
On June 22, 2020, Karrie Crouse and Will Joines were set to co-direct Dust, a psychological horror-thriller Crouse wrote in the Sundance Institute Writer's Lab, with Alix Madigan and Lucas Joaquin producing. The film was to be sold at the Cannes Film Festival. On October 29, 2020, Searchlight Pictures acquired the film.

On June 22, 2020, Claire Foy was cast as the lead. In July 2022, Sarah Paulson was cast. By August 2022, Annaleigh Ashford and Ebon Moss-Bachrach joined the cast. By September 1, 2022, Bill Heck and Amiah Miller joined the cast.

Principal photography commenced by August 5, 2022, in New Mexico. The film employed approximately 152 New Mexico crew members and 153 local background talent. Locations include Stanley, Santa Fe, and Gallisteo.

Release
Dust is scheduled to be released by Searchlight Pictures as a Hulu original film in the United States.

References

External links
 

Upcoming films
English-language films
American horror thriller films
American psychological horror films
American psychological thriller films
Films set in the 1930s
Films set in Oklahoma
Films shot in New Mexico
Hulu original films
Searchlight Pictures films
Upcoming English-language films